Maria-Gabriella Di Benedetto (born 1958) is an Italian electrical, audio, and communications engineer, whose research involves speech processing, wireless communication, and ultra-wideband signal processing. She is a professor of electrical engineering at Sapienza University of Rome.

She should be distinguished from Maria Domenica Di Benedetto, another Italian electrical engineer with similar career details.

Education and career
M.-G. Di Benedetto earned a laurea from Sapienza University of Rome in 1981, and completed her PhD in telecommunications there in 1987. After postdoctoral research at Selenia Spazio and a visiting position at the University of Perugia, she became an associate professor at Paris-Sud University in 1990 before returning to Sapienza University as an associate professor there in 1991. She also held a position as associate professor at the University of L'Aquila for 1995–1996, and has been a full professor of telecommunications at Sapienza University since 2000.

She visited the University of California, Berkeley in 1994 as John H. MacKay, Jr., Professor of Electrical Engineering, and was a visitor to the Radcliffe Institute for Advanced Study at Harvard University for 2019–2020, where she was the William Bentinck-Smith Fellow.

She is a Research Affiliate of the Massachusetts Institute of Technology (MIT), Cambridge, MA.

Book
M.-G. Di Benedetto is a coauthor of the book Understanding Ultra Wide Band Radio Fundamentals (with Guerino Giancola, Prentice-Hall, 2004). She is also an editor of several edited volumes on ultra wide band radio and speech processing.

Recognition
M.-G. Di Benedetto was named an IEEE Fellow, associated with the IEEE Communications Society, in the 2016 class of fellows, "for contributions to impulse-radio ultra wideband and cognitive networks for wireless communications".

In 2019 she was named Fellow of the Radcliffe Institute for Advanced Study at Harvard University.

References

External links
Home page

1958 births
Living people
Italian electrical engineers
Italian women engineers
Sapienza University of Rome alumni
Academic staff of the Sapienza University of Rome
Fellow Members of the IEEE